Johnny O (born in Brooklyn, New York) is an American freestyle and dance-pop singer. He reached the Billboard charts in the late 1980s with the singles "Fantasy girl", "Memories" and "Runaway Love".

Discography

Studio albums
1989: Johnny O
1990: Like a Stranger
1995: Call It Watcha Like
2002: The Sounds of My Heart
2007: Peace on Earth 2012
2011: Remedy (Grace of God)

Compilation albums
1993: The Remixes
1997: Best of Johnny O
2001: Johnny O's Greatest Hits
2003: Famous Very Words: The Very Best of Johnny O
2005: All the Hits and More!

Singles

References

External links 

Johnny O biography - Fever Records

American dance musicians
American male singers
American freestyle musicians
People from Brooklyn
Living people
Singers from New York City
1971 births